Callipappidae is a family of scales and mealybugs in the order Hemiptera. There are at least two genera and about nine described species in Callipappidae.

Genera
These two genera belong to the family Callipappidae:
 Callipappus Guérin-Méneville, 1841
 Platycoelostoma Morrison, 1923

References

Further reading

 

Scale insects